In mathematics, a quasitoric manifold is a topological analogue of the nonsingular projective toric variety of algebraic geometry. A smooth -dimensional manifold is a quasitoric manifold if it admits a smooth, locally standard action of an -dimensional torus, with orbit space an -dimensional simple convex polytope.

Quasitoric manifolds were introduced in 1991 by M. Davis and T. Januszkiewicz, who called them "toric manifolds". However, the term "quasitoric manifold" was eventually adopted to avoid confusion with the class of compact smooth toric varieties, which are known to algebraic geometers as toric manifolds.

Quasitoric manifolds are studied in a variety of contexts in algebraic topology, such as complex cobordism theory, and the other oriented cohomology theories.

Definitions
Denote the -th subcircle of the -torus  by  so that .

Given a simple convex polytope  with  facets, a -manifold  is a quasitoric manifold over  if,

 the -action is locally isomorphic to the standard representation,

The dicharacteristic function
A quasitoric manifold can be described in terms of a dicharacteristic function and an associated dicharacteristic matrix.

The epimorphism of Lie algebras associated to λ may be described as a linear transformation , represented by the  dicharacteristic matrix  given by

The isotropy subgroup associated to each facet  is described by

In their original treatment of quasitoric manifolds, Davis and Januskiewicz introduced the notion of a characteristic function that mapped each facet of the polytope to a vector determining the isotropy subgroup of the facet, but this is only defined up to sign. In more recent studies of quasitoric manifolds, this ambiguity has been removed by the introduction of the dicharacteristic function and its insistence that each circle  be oriented, forcing a choice of sign for each vector . The notion of the dicharacteristic function was originally introduced V. Buchstaber and N. Ray to enable the study of quasitoric manifolds in complex cobordism theory.

Relation to the moment-angle complex
The kernel  of the dicharacteristic function acts freely on the moment angle complex , and so defines a principal -bundle  over the resulting quotient space .  This quotient space can be viewed as

 

Examples
 The -dimensional complex projective space  is a quasitoric manifold over the -simplex . If  is embedded in  so that the origin is the initial vertex, a dicharacteristic function can be chosen so that the associated dicharacteristic matrix is

 The Bott manifolds that form the stages in a Bott tower are quasitoric manifolds over -cubes. The -cube  is embedded in  so that the origin is the initial vertex, and a dicharacteristic function is chosen so that the associated dicharacteristic matrix  has  given by

for integers .

,

The integer values  are the tensor powers of the line bundles whose product is used in the iterated sphere-bundle construction of the Bott tower.

The cohomology ring of a quasitoric manifold
Canonical complex line bundles  over  given by

 ,

These bundles are known as the facial bundles associated to the quasitoric manifold.

 .

Therefore only  are required to generate  multiplicatively.

Comparison with toric manifolds
 Any projective toric manifold is a quasitoric manifold, and in some cases non-projective toric manifolds are also quasitoric manifolds.
 Not all quasitoric manifolds are toric manifolds. For example, the connected sum  can be constructed as a quasitoric manifold, but it is not a toric manifold.

Notes

References

Algebraic topology
Topology
Manifolds